In the area of mathematics known as K-theory, the Quillen spectral sequence, also called the Brown–Gersten–Quillen or BGQ spectral sequence (named after Kenneth Brown, 
Stephen Gersten, and Daniel Quillen), is a spectral sequence converging to the sheaf cohomology of a type of topological space that occurs in algebraic geometry. It is used in calculating the homotopy properties of a simplicial group.

References

External links 
 A spectral sequence of Quillen at the Stacks Project

Algebraic K-theory